The IQA World Cup VII was the 2014 edition of the IQA World Cup (now the US Quidditch Cup), a quidditch club tournament then organized by the International Quidditch Association. The tournament was held in North Myrtle Beach, South Carolina from April 5–6, 2014.

The Cup featured 73 teams from the United States, five from Canada and one from Australia, that qualified through eight regional championships. The final, which saw two Texan teams competing against each other, resulted in a 130*–70 victory for the University of Texas at Austin against Texas State University.

Format
80 teams qualified for the cup and were divided into 16 pools of five team each. However, due to a late withdrawal from the Rutgers Nearly Headless Knights less than a week from the tournament, pool 14 ended up with only four teams and the tournament was finally contested by 79 teams. Each team played against all other teams in their pool, and the three best teams of each pool advanced to the 48-team single-elimination bracket phase. The winner of each pool received a bye in the first round, entering the bracket at the round of 32.

Results

Bracket phase
Three out of four teams in the semi-finals hailed from Texas. University of Texas at Austin beat Texas A&M Quidditch 110*–50, while Texas State University defeated Emerson College Quidditch 140*–80. The University of Texas claimed its second championship with a 130*–70 victory against Texas State University.

References

External links
IQA World Cup VII archived by the Wayback Machine
US Quidditch

2014 in sports in South Carolina
US Quidditch Cup
2014 in American sports
Sports competitions in South Carolina
April 2014 sports events in the United States